The SSC Ultimate Aero is a mid-engined sports car that was produced by SSC North America (formerly known as Shelby SuperCars) from 2004 until 2013. The SSC Ultimate Aero held the world production car speed record title, according to the Guinness World Records, from 2007 (when it was officially timed at 410 km/h) until the introduction of the Bugatti Veyron Super Sport in 2010. In April 2013, the Guinness World Records temporarily disqualified the Veyron's record time for a period of five days due to concerns about electronic speed limiting changing the function of the car, but after investigation reinstated the Veyron as the record holder.

The SSC Ultimate Aero was not sold with electronic driver aids such as an anti-lock braking system or traction control system, as according to Jerod Shelby (no relations to Carroll Shelby), "Early design philosophy on the car was to make it a driver's car. I wanted a car that you not only throttled with your right foot but at times you could steer with your right foot and a sensor."

History

SSC Aero SC/8T Number 1 (2004)
The first SSC Aero prototype was completed in 2004 and began road testing in anticipation of the SSC Ultimate Aero production vehicle.

Specifications:
 Engine - Supercharged  LS1-based V8
 Power -  @ 6,600 rpm
 Torque -  @ 5,800 rpm
 Redline - 7200 rpm
 Top speed -  (claimed)
 Dry weight -

SSC Ultimate Aero SC/8T Number 2 (2005)
Wind tunnel testing indicated that the Ultimate Aero could theoretically reach a top speed of 275 mph (442 km/h, 123 m/s) given appropriate transmission gear ratios, although the supplied transmission would result in 268 mph (432 km/h, 120 m/s) at the car's redline. The base Aero, however, had a theoretical top speed of about 234 mph. The Ultimate Aero accelerates from 0–100 km/h (62 mph) in 2.78 seconds, slower than the Bugatti Veyron which achieves 0–100 km/h in 2.46 seconds, partially due to its AWD drivetrain.

Specifications:
 Engine - Supercharged 6,300 cc Chevrolet Corvette C5-R V8
 Power - 590 kW (791 hp) @ 6600 rpm
 Torque - 1,000 N⋅m (737 lb-ft) @ 5800 rpm
 Redline - 7200 rpm
 Max Speed - 234 mph (378 km/h, 105 m/s)
 Dry weight - 1,300 kg

2006

Styling of the Aero includes the use of butterfly doors similar to those found on the McLaren F1 and Ferrari Enzo. Carbon fibre and titanium are used throughout the car, helping to limit the weight to 1,300 kg for the standard Aero. The SSC Ultimate Aero was the final version of the prototype, introduced in 2006. It had an increased engine displacement of 6,300 cc and increased boost to 100 kPa.

Specifications:
Engine: supercharged 6,300 cc Chevrolet Corvette C5R V8
Power: 780 kW (1045 hp) @ 6950 rpm
Torque: 1,100 N⋅m (811 lb-ft) @ 6200 rpm
Redline: 7200 rpm
Top speed: 400 km/h (248 mph)
Dry weight: 1,200 kg

2007–2008
The Ultimate Aero TT was a twin-turbocharged version of the Ultimate Aero. The 6-speed transmission was readjusted to increase the theoretical top speed to 440 km/h (273 mph) at 7200 rpm. Wheels on the base model are sized 460 mm at the front and 480 mm at the rear, while the Ultimate Aero TT has wheels an inch larger at each end. The 2007 models are heavier, with the base model weighing 1,300 kg, and Ultimate version 1,250 kg. Unlike the previous year, base models have a navigation system, 10-speaker audio/CD/DVD system, video/DVD screen, back-up camera, air-conditioning, and trunk space as standard equipment. These come optional on the Ultimate. The first production 2007 Ultimate Aero TT car was sold on eBay for US$431,100. Later cars are expected to cost US$285,000. Only 24 Ultimate Aero TTs were produced from 2006 to 2007. The Ultimate Aero TT made its international debut on the International Show Circuit in November 2006. The Ultimate Aero TT claimed the Guinness World Records for the fastest production car, after it was officially timed at 410 km/h (254 mph) in Washington. For 2008, the Ultimate Aero received four updates:

New twin-turbocharged V8
New aluminium engine block
Standard HRE monoblock wheels
Azentek Atlas computer infotainment system
Specifications:
 Engine - twin-turbocharged 6,300 cc bored-out LS6
Power - 880 kW (1180 hp) @ 6950 rpm
Torque - 1,500 Nm (1106 ft-lb) @ 6150 rpm
Redline - 7200 rpm
Top speed - 410 km/h (254 mph)
Dry weight - 1,250 kg

SSC Ultimate Aero TT
In 2009, SSC updated the Ultimate Aero TT, with the new version having an increase in power of 15% over the older model. SSC predicts a top speed of over 430 km/h (267 mph) is possible. In order to prevent the engine from overheating, airflow to the engine has been increased 20% with new carbon fibre louvres. The nose has been redesigned to make the car more aerodynamic, and the interior has been redesigned. The new Aero also has a new AeroBrake system, which is a spoiler which rises up to 200 mm when the brake is pressed. This updated model reached a top speed of 415 km/h (258 mph) in a test, according to SSC.

Specifications:
Engine: twin-turbocharged 6,300 cc SSC V8
Power: 960 kW (1287 hp) @ 6100 rpm
Torque:  @ 6100 rpm
Redline: 7200 rpm
Top speed: 415 km/h (257 mph)
Dry weight: 1,250 kg
A 2009 SSC Ultimate Aero, albeit with the new prototype SSC Tuatara gearbox fitted, was able to complete six runs of 0–300 km/h (186 mph) from 15.1 to 15.8 seconds, according to SSC's gear ratio testing results.

SSC Ultimate Aero EV
In 2009, SSC announced that they would be commencing production of the Ultimate Aero EV, an electrically powered version of the Ultimate Aero. This car featured twin electric motors, claimed to be capable of producing 750 kW (1005 hp) and 1,085 N⋅m (800 ft-lb) of torque through a three-speed automatic transmission. SSC claimed that the car would be able to accelerate from 0–100 km/h (62 mph) in 2.5 seconds, and reach a top speed of 335 km/h (208 mph). However, the car never entered production.

2013
In 2013, SSC introduced the Ultimate Aero XT, which was a special version of the Ultimate Aero that was built to celebrate the end of its production. Five XTs were planned, but only one was built. They utilised some components that were designed for its Tuatara replacement; for example, the Ultimate Aero XT was fitted with SSC's new 6.9-litre all-aluminium twin-turbocharged V8 engine and a seven-speed paddle-shifted gearbox.

Specifications
Engine: twin-turbocharged 6,900 cc SSC V8
Power: 970 kW (1300 hp) @ 6800 rpm
Torque: 1,360 N⋅m (1000 ft-lb) @ 6800 rpm
Redline: 9100 rpm
Top speed (theoretical) - 268 mph (432 km/h, 120 m/s)
Top speed (actual): 257 mph (414 km/h, 115 m/s)
Drag coefficient: 0.357cd
Dry weight: 1,270 kg
Kerb weight: 1,300 kg

Speed record
Simulation and testing at NASA's Langley Research Centre had shown the Ultimate Aero TT theoretically capable of attaining approximately 440 km/h, sufficient to surpass the production car record-holding Bugatti Veyron's 408 km/h.

A 20 km stretch of Route 93 was closed on March 21, 2007, to allow SSC to test the Ultimate Aero TT, but the attempt was called off due to bad weather, and an effort the following day failed due to sub-optimal conditions, with test driver Rick Doria reporting wheelspin at speeds above 300 km/h.

The results were verified by the Guinness World Records on October 9, 2007. SSC is currently one of only twenty-six car manufacturers in history to have held the record.

SSC also applied to Guinness for the world record for the highest power for an emissions-legal production car.

See also 

 List of production cars by power output

References

External links 

Sports cars
Coupés
Rear mid-engine, rear-wheel-drive vehicles
Cars introduced in 2004
2000s cars
2010s cars